Dudley Edward Mattingly (3 April 1928 – 19 September 1996) was an Australian rules footballer who played 3 games with St Kilda in the Victorian Football League (VFL) in 1948.

Notes

External links 

1928 births
Australian rules footballers from New South Wales
St Kilda Football Club players
1996 deaths